Wangkhao Government College, is a general degree college in Mon, Nagaland, India. It offers undergraduate courses in arts and is affiliated to Nagaland University. This college was established in 1983.

History 
The setting up of Arts College, Mon, now called Wangkhao Government College, was spearheaded by the then Konyak Students' Conference (KSC), now the Konyak Students' Union (KSU) through a resolution adopted in their annual conference in the late 1970s. Every Konyak household contributed a token of ₹ 2/- (Rupees two only) in the college find raising. The contributions came from different sources as well, such as; the district government employees, business community and well wishers. 

The Board of Governors of the College, were;

1. Shri.R. S. Pandey (the then, Deputy Commissioner, Mon)

2.Shri. W. Manpong Yanlem (Retd. DIS)

3. Dr. Rev. Pongshing (Member, RTI Commission, Nagaland)

4.Shri. L. T. Konyak (the then, Deputy Commissioner, Mon)

5. Shri. Yanang (Retd. Chairman of NPSC)

6.Shri. Tingyeih (Ex- President, KSC)

7. Shri. Noke (MLA)

8. Shri. Taiwang

9. Dr. N. V. George (Founder Principal)

10. Shri. A. C. Bal (The then, ADC, Mon)

Arts College, Mon was inaugurated by Shri. Nocklem Konyak, the then Home Minister, Nagaland on 5 July 1983. Subsequently, the government order of approval was issued in two months time (Vide Govt. Order No. HTE/Col-Dev/10/83) dated Kohima, the 9th September, 1983. At the same time the College was granted permission by the North-Eastern Hill University (NEHU) to begin the classes from the academic session 1983-84 for PU to Degree courses. Initially the classes were conducted in Government High School, Mon in the afternoon. The college was formally affiliated to NEHU in the year 1986.Subsequently, the college was taken over by the state government from the private management in the year 1990. With the formal separation from the NEHU when the Nagaland University was established as the Central University in Nagaland in 1994, since then, the college was automatically affiliated to the Nagaland University.

A permanent site was required for the establishment of a college complex. The Board of Governors, therefore sought land donation from Chi and Mon villagers. Fortunately, the Chi villagers responded positively to the clarion call by donating an area of 68.389 acres of land (as per the Land Record and Survey Department). However, the College renamed as Wangkhao College after the name of the Chief Ahng of Chi village; Late Wangkhao Ahng (MalaiGangkhao).

Therefore with the pleading of the Chi villagers the preference apropos admission in college, appointment of III and IV grade staff and construction and supply works are allotted to the land donors provided capable persons are available. The Board of Governors honoured their request and finally, the ' Deed of Gift' agreement was signed on December 9, 1991 between His Majesty, Wangkhao Ahng and individual landowners of Chi village and the DC Mon, representing the Managing Board.
 
The college was shifted from the Government High School to a rented building owned by Shri. S. Yokten Konyak in 1988 and it remained there till the end of August 1995.

Departments

Arts
English 
History 
Political Science 
Philosophy
Economics
Education

Accreditation
The college is recognized by the University Grants Commission (UGC).

References

 Silver Jubilee souvenir

External links
http://www.wangkhaocollege.edu.in/

Colleges affiliated to Nagaland University
Universities and colleges in Nagaland
Educational institutions established in 1983
1983 establishments in Nagaland